Sasha Marianne Sökol Cuillery (born 17 June 1970) is a Mexican singer, composer, actress and television presenter.

Biography
Sökol was born in Mexico City. When she was still a toddler, her parents (Michael "Happy" Sökol and Magdalena Cuillery) divorced and her mother married Fernando Diez Barroso, an executive at Televisa. As a child, she was known as Sasha Diez Barroso, but now goes by her paternal name, Sökol. She studied at the Colegio Peterson and later at the Centro de Educación Artística (CEA) of Televisa. At that time, the music and television producer Luis de Llano Macedo was seeking to create a Mexican version of the band Parchís, and Sökol held castings at the CEA.

Sökol has one brother named Michel Sokol Cuillery and two sisters, Alexandra and Ximena Diez Barroso.

Timbiriche
Sökol was selected as one of the original seven members and that is how she started her singing career in 1982. Sökol recorded seven albums with Timbiriche, which earned 25 gold albums and ten platinum albums. Timbiriche earned her awards from El Heraldo and the TVyNovelas Awards. In 1984, with Timbiriche, Sökol participated in Vaselina as Sandy, the Spanish-language version of Grease. In 1986, she left Timbiriche and moved to Boston, Massachusetts, US to continue her acting studies.

Solo career

In 1986, Sökol enrolled at the Walnut Hill School for the Performing Arts. The following year, she released her first solo album, Sasha, which sold over a million copies in Mexico, making it one of Mexico's best-selling albums in 1987. Her first single was "No Me Extraña Nada", which was released with a music video. She was nicknamed "La Dama de Negro" (The Lady in Black) for her habit of dressing in said color. The biggest hit of the album was "Rueda Mi Mente", which peaked at number one on Mexican radio and remained there for several weeks. Sökol made her television solo debut in Siempre En Domingo, the biggest variety show in Ibero-America at the time.

In 1988, she released the maxi-single "Diamante", which was chosen as the theme song for the music magazine Eres. In 1988, she also launched a television career with the series Tres Generaciones (TV Show) (Three Generations), starring Carmen Montejo and Angélica María.

In 1989, she recorded a song titled "Detrás del Amor" for the compilation album Nos vamos de vacaciones, which also featured Alejandra Guzmán and Alix Bauer (another ex-Timbiriche). She released her second album, Trampas de luz, that year.

In 1990, she recorded the song "Amor amor" for the compilation album Juntos ayer y hoy, and the song "Noche de ronda" for the compilation album El estudio de Lara.

In 1991, Sökol released her third album, Siento, and appeared in the Mexican soap opera Alcanzar una estrella II. It was a tremendous hit and the musical group from the telenovela, called Muñecos de papel (Paper Dolls) which included Sökol, Ricky Martin, Bibi Gaytan and Angélica Rivera among others, released two soundtrack albums with music from the series. Muñecos de papel had such success that they went on a national tour throughout Mexico and were nominated as "Revelation of the Year" at the second annual awards show for Premios Eres, and won the coveted honor.

In 1992, Sökol released her fourth solo album, Amor sin tiempo.

From the late 1980s to the early 1990s, Sökol was among the most popular singers in Mexico and Latin America. Her most successful album has been her first, Sasha (1987). At that time, she was considered the top female pop icon in Mexico and her style was imitated by hordes of teenagers throughout Mexico, and led to the release of her own jewellery line and a perfume labelled "Fama".

In 1993, Sökol put her career on hold and put herself in rehabilitation for cocaine addiction. Months later, she formally made statements to the Mexican media about her drug addiction and rehabilitation. She publicly apologized to her fans for her disappearance and for all the rumors that were brought forth while out of the spotlight.

In 1997, she returned to the music scene with an album titled 11:11, released by Sony Mexico. The first single, Seras el Aire, was a huge hit and is one of her signature songs.  Right before she started a 1998 tour titled 11:11 acústico (11:11 Acoustic), which was to take place throughout Mexico and certain countries in Central and South America, her international tour was cancelled because of her mother's hospitalization and eventual death.

In 1998, Sökol joined all original founding members of the Mexican pop group Timbiriche in an international tour, and they recorded a double album titled El concierto.

In 2004, she returned once again to the music scene, after a long absence, with the album Por un amor. This album is distinct to her fans as it is not of the pop music genre, but one that belongs to the traditional Mexican music genre, rancheras.

In 2005, Sokol participated in the reality show Big Brother VIP and won the grand prize.

In 2006, she recorded the song "No encuentro un momento pa' olvidar" with the Spanish singer Miguel Bosé.

In 2007, she joined the original founding members of Timbiriche (except Paulina Rubio because of an international solo tour) to celebrate the 25th anniversary of the group. In 2010, the same six founding members of Timbiriche went on tour again.

In 2010, Sökol returned to the pop music genre with her seventh pop album, and eighth album overall, Tiempo Amarillo. 
Up to 2010, Sasha had earned four platinum albums, three gold albums and one diamond album in her solo career.

In 2012, Sökol joined Erik Rubin and Benny Ibarra, fellow members of the pop group Timbiriche, and released Primera Fila: Sasha Benny Erik, a live album featuring their greatest hits as a musical trio called Sasha, Benny y Erik. The album includes three hits from each artist, three cover songs and one new track.  The unique aspect of this live album is that they sing all 13 tracks together. At the end of 2013, the album Primera Fila: Sasha Benny Erik was officially recognized by AMPROFON as the best-selling album in Mexico that year, but the was the third best selling album overall when accounting for the cumulative sales of other top albums since their original release dates. In late 2014, Sasha, Benny y Erik will release their first studio album "Vuelta al Sol" and release "Esta Noche" as their first single.

In 2017, Sasha joined the original founding members of Timbiriche (current line up includes original members Sasha Sokol, Benny Ibarra, Alix Bauer, Erik Rubin, Mariana Garza and Diego Schoening) to celebrate the 35th anniversary of the group. The tour will continue into 2018.

Discography

Solo albums
 1987: Sasha
 1988: Diamante
 1989: Trampas de Luz
 1991: Siento
 1992: Amor Sin Tiempo
 1997: 11:11
 2004: Por Un Amor
 2010: Tiempo Amarillo
 2020: Yo Soy

Singles
Sasha (1987–1988)
 "No Me Extraña Nada"
 "Rueda Mi Mente"
 "La Leyenda"
 "Guerra Total"
 "Tipico"

Diamante (1988)
 "Diamante"

Trampas de Luz (1989–1990)
 "Algo de Mi"
 "Muevete a Mi Alrededor"
 "Olvidalo"
 "Amante Sin Amor"
 "Detras Del Amor (Nos Vamos De Vacaciones)"

Siento (1991–1992)
 "Corriendo Peligro"
 "Siento"
 "Todos Mis Caminos Van a Ti" (with Ricky Martin)
 "Justo en el Momento"
 "Tengo Miedo"
 "Cartas"

Sasha (1992–1993)
 "Numero Uno"
 "Pica y Repica"
 "Piensame Sola"
 "Dimelo"

11:11 (1997–1998)
 "Seras el Aire"
 "Ya No Te Extraño"
 "En la Ciudad"
 "Me Faltas Tu"

Por Un Amor (2004)
 "Por Un Amor"
 "El Gustito"
 "La Cucaracha"

Tiempo Amarillo (2010)
 "La Ultima Vez"
 "Luna de París"
 "Dulce Veneno"
 "Agua"

Compilations
 Combo de Exitos: Somos la Historia (2006)
 Solamente Sasha: Sus Exitos (2004)
 Lo Mejor de Sasha (2002)
 Cara a Cara (1997)
 No Me Extraña Nada: Linea de Oro (1995)
 Personalidad (1994)
 Sus Exitos (1991)
 La Coleccion (1990)

DVD
 Combo de Exitos: Somos la Historia (2006)
 Legado Musical (2005)

Reissues
 Sus Exitos (2004)
 No Me Extraña Nada (Sasha "1987") (2003)
 11:11 (2009)
 11:11 (2001)
 Siento (2001)
 Sus Exitos (1999)
 Sus Exitos (1996)
 Personalidad (1995)

Various artists compilations
 Esta Navidad – Various Artists ("En el Portal de Belen") (1987)
 Estrellas de Navidad – Various Artists ("Adelante Adelante") (1988)
 Tambien Para Ti Es Navidad – Various Artists (1989)
 Nueva Navidad – Various Artists ("Adelante Adelante")
 Nos Vamos de Vacaciones – Various Artists ("Detras del Amor" ) (1989)
 Juntos Ayer y Hoy – Various Artists ("Amor Amor") (1990)
 El Estudio de Lara – Various Artists ("Noche de Ronda") (1990)
 Mexico: Voz y Sentimiento – Various Artists ("Tu Desvario")(1991)
 Feliz Navidad Te Desean – Various Artists ("Rodolfo el Reno de la Nariz Roja") (1991)
 Muñecos de Papel – Various Artists (1991)
 Boleros: Voz y Sentimiento – Various Artists ("Sorpresa") (1992)
 De Epoca: La Era de los 80's – Sasha, Timbiriche, Alejandra Guzman, Lucero, Flans ("Remix Medley: Con Todos Menos Conmigo / Las Mil y Una Noches / Eternamente Bella / Cuentame / Timido / Tu y Yo Somos Uno Mismo / Bazar / No Me Extraña Nada / Vete Con Ella / Me He Enamorado de Un Fan / Reina de Corazones / Corro, Vuelo, Me Acelero / Soy Un Desastre / No Controles / Besos de Ceniza") (1994)
 Navidad de las Estrellas – Various Artists ("Medley: Alegres Cantada / Se Feliz / Santa Claus de Noche Vendra – Sasha, Yuri, Alejandra Avalos, Susana Zabaleta") (1995)
 El Premio Mayor – Various Artists ("El Premio Mayor") (1996)
 Sony Dance Mix Vol. 3 – Various Artists ("Seras el Aire": Mijangos Club Edit) (1997)
 Vuelveme a Querer – Various Artists ("Noche de Ronda") (1998)

Collaborations
 Hey Tu – Aleks Syntek ("Te Quiero Asi" – Aleks Syntek with Sasha)  (1990)
 Eres – Calo / Sasha ("Eres: Version Original" – Calo with Sasha) ("Eres: Techno Mix" – Calo with Sasha)  (1991)
 Mixes y Remixes – Calo ("Eres: Techno Mix" – Calo with Sasha)  (1992)
 Realidad – Fratta ("Las Flores – Fratta with Sasha)  (1999)
 Basico 3 – Revolver ("Ay Amor" – Carlos Goñi with Sasha)  (2006)
 Papito – Miguel Bosé ("No Encuentro Un Momento Pa´ Olvidar"  Miguel Bosé with Sasha) (2007)

With Timbiriche
 1982: Timbiriche
 1982: La Banda Timbiriche
 1983: En Concierto
 1983: Disco Ruido
 1983: Que No Acabe Navidad
 1984: Vaselina
 1985: Rock Show

With Reencuentro Timbiriche
 1989: Los Clásicos de Timbiriche
 1998: Timbiriche Clasico
 1999: El Concierto
 2007: Timbiriche 25
 2007: Somos Timbiriche 25 en Vivo
 2007: Timbiriche 25 Vivo en Vivo
 2017: Timbiriche: Juntos

With Muñecos de Papel
 Muñecos de Papel (Muñecos de Papel – Sasha, Ricky Martin, Angelica Rivera, Pedro Fernandez, Alex Ibarra) ("Siento") – Various Artists (1991)
 Alcanzar Una Estrella II ("No Quiero Dejar de Brillar" – Sasha, Ricky Martin, Bibi Gaytan, Erick Rubin, Angelica Rivera, Pedro Fernandez) – Various Artists  (1991)

Unedited tracks
 "El Breve Espacio"
 "El Premio Mayor" (ballad version)
 "Ser Es Humano"
 "El Juego de la Gloria" (with Muñecos de Papel)

Unedited remixes
 "Tengo Miedo": radio remix (available on 12" promo) (1992)
 "Pica Y Repica": dance single (available on CD promo) (1993)
 "Pica Y Repica": dance mix (available on CD promo) (1993)
 "Sasha Mix": extended edit (available on CD promo) (2002)
 "La Cucaracha": Iguana mix (available on CD promo) (2004)

Acting

Theater
 Vaselina (Grease), as Sandy
 La Flauta Mágica, Narradora

Films
 Ámbar (1994), as Angélica
 Una Historia Viva (short)

Television shows
 Tres Generaciones (1988–1989), as Andrea
 Big Brother VIP México (2005), as herself
 Buscando a Timbiriche: La Nueva Banda (2007), as herself (jury)
 Cultura en Línea (2001–2002), as herself

Telenovelas
 1991: Alcanzar Una Estrella II as Jessica Lascurain
 1999: La Vida en el Espejo as Gabriela Muñoz (lead actress)
 2002: El País de las Mujeres as Ana (lead actress)
 1995: El Premio Mayor'' as Rosario Dominguez (lead actress)

References

External links
 Sasha Sokol – official site

1970 births
Mexican women singers
Mexican television actresses
Mexican telenovela actresses
Mexican film actresses
Mexican child actresses
Mexican stage actresses
Mexican television presenters
Mexican people of Czech descent
Mexican women composers
Singers from Mexico City
Living people
Timbiriche members
Big Brother (franchise) winners
Actresses from Mexico City
Mexican women television presenters